The Behelfs-Schützenmine S.150 was an anti-personnel mine that was developed by Germany and used by the Wehrmacht during World War II.

Design 

The Behelfs-Schützenmine S.150 was designed to be a small, low cost, and easy to produce anti-personnel mine.  It was known by a number of nicknames such as the "Pot Mine", "Picric Pot", "Jerry Mine", or "Mustard Pot" due to its brownish-yellow color. The body was cylindrical in shape and was made from pressed steel or aluminum and contained an explosive charge of powdered picric acid.  The top plate was pressed steel or aluminum which screwed onto the body and a chemical crush igniter known as a German Buck Igniter screwed into the center of the top plate.  The igniter was aluminum and contained a glass ampule half-filled with sulfuric acid that was surrounded by potassium perchlorate flash powder.  A small brass detonator (German Nr. 8) was inserted into the center of the explosives.   pressure on the igniter crushes the glass ampule inside which pours the acid onto the flash powder creating a chemical reaction, which creates a flash that ignites the detonator and explodes the mine.  The mine did not have a safety or anti-tamper mechanism and disarming the mine was fairly simple because a soldier just had to unscrew the igniter near the base avoiding the fragile top.

References

Anti-personnel mines
World War II weapons of Germany
Land mines of Germany
Weapons and ammunition introduced in 1944